L'Universale is a 2016 Italian comedy film directed by Federico Micali.

The film is set in Florence, Tuscany during the 1970s and is centered on the story of the popular Cinema Universale in Oltrarno.

Cast

References

External links

2016 films
2010s Italian-language films
2016 comedy films
Italian comedy films
Films set in Florence
2010s Italian films